Charlotte Afriat (born 17 October 2002) is a Monegasque track and field athlete competing in sprinting events. She competed in the women's 100 metres event at the 2019 World Athletics Championships held in Doha, Qatar. She did not qualify to compete in the semi-finals.

She represented Monaco at the 2018 Mediterranean Games held in Tarragona, Spain and she finished in 11th place in the women's 100 metres event. In the same year, she also competed in the girls' 100 metres at the Summer Youth Olympics held in Buenos Aires, Argentina. She was the flag bearer for Monaco during the opening ceremony of the 2018 Summer Youth Olympics.

She also competed in the women's 100 metres event at the 2019 Games of the Small States of Europe held in Budva, Montenegro and she finished in last place out of eight competitors.

In 2021, she competed in the women's 100 metres event at the 2020 Summer Olympics held in Tokyo, Japan. She was the only athlete to represent Monaco in athletics at the 2020 Summer Olympics.

References

External links 
 
 

Living people
2002 births
Place of birth missing (living people)
Monegasque female sprinters
World Athletics Championships athletes for Monaco
Athletes (track and field) at the 2018 Summer Youth Olympics
Athletes (track and field) at the 2018 Mediterranean Games
Mediterranean Games competitors for Monaco
Athletes (track and field) at the 2020 Summer Olympics
Olympic athletes of Monaco
Olympic female sprinters